Michal Nedvídek (born May 13, 1987) is a Czech professional ice hockey goaltender. He played with HC Bílí Tygři Liberec in the Czech Extraliga during the 2006–07 Czech Extraliga season.

References

External links

1987 births
Czech ice hockey goaltenders
HC Bílí Tygři Liberec players
Living people
HC Vlci Jablonec nad Nisou players
HC Benátky nad Jizerou players